David M. Rogers is an American state legislator serving in the Massachusetts House of Representatives. He is a Cambridge resident and a member of the Democratic Party.

See also
 Massachusetts House of Representatives' 24th Middlesex district
 2019–2020 Massachusetts legislature
 2021–2022 Massachusetts legislature

References

Living people
Democratic Party members of the Massachusetts House of Representatives
Place of birth missing (living people)
Politicians from Cambridge, Massachusetts
21st-century American politicians
Year of birth missing (living people)